Annick Ménardo is a contemporary perfumer who has worked for the fragrance firm Firmenich since 1991.

Education
Ménardo has a background in biochemistry and medicine. She studied perfumery and is a graduate of the French perfume academy ISIPCA. She was mentored by Michel Almairac while working at Créations Aromatiques, and her early work is influenced by his style.

Career
Ménardo worked with sculptor Nobi Shioya in his /7S/ olfactory art installation. She created the scent for the sculpture "Anger". Nobi said she was easily assigned to the piece "because (she) is always angry."

Works

Annick Ménardo has created  perfumes including:
Lolita Lempicka Au Masculin,  Lolita Lempicka
Body Kouros, Yves Saint Laurent 
Hypnotic Poison, Christian Dior
Bois d'Argent, Christian Dior
Boss Bottled, Hugo Boss
Black, Bvlgari
Lolita Lempicka, Lolita Lempicka
Gaiac 10, Le Labo
Patchouli 24, Le Labo
Bois d'Armenie, Guerlain
Altikä, Yves Rocher
Comme une Evidence Femme, Yves Rocher
Miracle So Magic, Lancôme
Fuel For Life, Diesel
Jaïpur Homme, Boucheron
Visit, Loris Azzaro
Red, Lacoste
Moment de Bonheur, Yves Rocher
Rose Oud, Yves Rocher
Xeryus Rouge, Givenchy
Sports Car Club, Penhaligon's

References

Year of birth missing (living people)
French perfumers
Living people
Olfactory art